Paradrillia sultana is a species of sea snail, a marine gastropod mollusk in the family Horaiclavidae.

Description
The length of the shell attains 7.9 mm, its diameter 2.9 mm.

Distribution
This marine species occurs in the Indian Ocean off Tanzania and in the Yellow Sea

References

External links
 
  Baoquan Li 李宝泉 & R.N. Kilburn, Report on Crassispirinae Morrison, 1966 (Mollusca: Neogastropoda: Turridae) from the China Seas; Journal of Natural History 44(11):699-740 · March 2010; DOI: 10.1080/00222930903470086

sultana
Gastropods described in 1925